Alexis "Alex" Gravel (born March 21, 2000) is a Canadian collegiate ice hockey goaltender who currently plays for the UQTR Patriotes of the U Sports. Gravel was selected in the sixth round, 162nd overall, by the Chicago Blackhawks in the 2018 NHL Entry Draft.

Playing career

Junior
Before being drafted into major junior hockey, Gravel played two seasons for the Missasauga Senators of the Greater Toronto Hockey League and was selected 20th overall in the second round of the 2016 QMJHL Entry Draft by the Halifax Mooseheads.

Gravel began playing for the Mooseheads the following season, the 2016–17 season. In his first season with the team he played 50 games with 17 wins, 24 losses, and 3 overtime losses. Gravel had one shutout and had a (.894) save percentage and played 6 games in the playoffs for Halifax, the team was eliminated in the first round in 6 games by the Rouyn-Noranda Huskies. Gravel was a nominee for the Raymond Lagacé Trophy, which is the award given annually to the QMJHL's best defensive rookie of the year.

In his second season with the Mooseheads, Gravel found himself starting in fewer games and with a declining save percentage. He later admitted he was no longer enjoying the game, saying, "Mentally, I just wasn’t there. I think that screwed me a little bit." Gravel was selected 162nd overall by the Chicago Blackhawks in the 2018 NHL Entry Draft.

A summer of enhanced workouts, together with hands-on training with Blackhawks developmental goalie coach Peter Aubrey, helped to refocus Gravel's attention for the 2018–19 QMJHL season.  Starting in 49 games for the Mooseheads, he finished the regular season with 33 wins and a .913 save percentage, leading the team to first place in the league's Eastern Conference. In the QMJHL President Cup playoffs, Gravel backstopped the Mooseheads to its best finish in seven seasons, winning 14 of 23 games en route to a 4–2 series loss to the Rouyn-Noranda in the league final.

The two teams would meet again in the final of the 2019 Memorial Cup, the national championship of the Canadian Hockey League, by virtue of the Halifax's status as tournament host. While the Mooseheads would drop a 4–2 decision to the Huskies in the championship game, Gravel was awarded the Hap Emms Memorial Trophy as the tournament's best goalie, with a save percentage of .918 and a goals-against average of 2.78. Gravel was also named to the tournament all-star team.

Professional
Un-signed by the Blackhawks, Gravel embarked on his professional career as a free agent before agreeing to join the Allen Americans of the ECHL for the 2021–22 season on October 13, 2021.

International play

Gravel was born in Germany but represents Canada in international competition. He was a goalie for Canada at the 2016 Winter Youth Olympics where he played in 4 games for Canada, earning a (.902) save percentage. Gravel also competed for Canada men's national under-18 ice hockey team and was named to the 2017 Ivan Hlinka Memorial Tournament, a tournament not sanctioned by the International Ice Hockey Federation, winning gold with Canada, and defeating the Czech Republic 4–1. Gravel played only one game for Canada in the tournament, earning a (3.69) goals against average with a (.857) save percentage.

Personal life
Gravel was born in Berlin, Germany but grew up in Asbestos, Quebec. He is the son of Francois Gravel, a former professional ice hockey goaltender who was selected in the 3rd round, 87th overall in the 1987 NHL Entry Draft by the Montreal Canadiens and also represented France in the 1998 Winter Olympics. Gravel was inspired to play goaltender because of his father, and began playing when he was around five years old, first playing in Italy where his father played for 12 years.

Career statistics

Regular season and playoffs

References

External links 
 

2000 births
Living people
Allen Americans players
Canadian ice hockey goaltenders
Chicago Blackhawks draft picks
Halifax Mooseheads players
Ice hockey players at the 2016 Winter Youth Olympics
Youth Olympic silver medalists for Canada